The 2002 Big 12 Conference baseball tournament was for the first time held at Rangers Ballpark in Arlington in Arlington, Texas, from May 22 through 26.  Texas won their first tournament and earned the Big 12 Conference's automatic bid to the 2002 NCAA Division I baseball tournament. The tournament mirrored the format of the College World Series, with two 4-team double-elimination brackets and a final championship game. 2002 set an NCAA record for attendance at a conference tournament, with 150,196 people attending the 5-day event.

Regular Season Standings
Source:

Colorado and Iowa State did not sponsor baseball teams.

Tournament

 * indicates extra-inning game.
Kansas and Missouri did not make the tournament.

All-Tournament Team

See also
College World Series
NCAA Division I Baseball Championship
Big 12 Conference baseball tournament

References

Big 12 Tourney media guide 
Boydsworld 2002 Standings

Tournament
Big 12 Conference Baseball Tournament
Big 12 Conference baseball tournament
Big 12 Conference baseball tournament
21st century in Arlington, Texas
College sports tournaments in Texas
Baseball competitions in Arlington, Texas